Lautenbach is a village in Baden-Württemberg, Germany. It is administratively part of the town of Gernsbach in the Rastatt district.

Geography 

The village is located south-east of Gernsbach on the Lautenbach stream, a tributary of the Murg River.

History 
The first documented mention of Lautenbach is as 'Lutembach' in the year 1339–1340. On January 1, 1975, Reichental was incorporated into the town of Gernsbach.

References

Villages in Baden-Württemberg